Abdul Waris Umaru, known as Comedian Waris, is a Ghanaian comedian and actor.

Early life 
Comedian Waris was born in Kumasi; his father is Umaru Ibrahim. He had his primary education at Kingsway School and went on to Odorgonno Senior High School. His tertiary education was at Top Media School where he graduated in 2014.

Career 
Waris worked as an intern at both Top FM and Rainbow Radio as sound engineer 2014 later moved to Channel5 TV in the same 2014. In 2015 he worked at ecstasy entertainment as stand-up comedian and personal assistant to award-winning comedian DKB. He established the Waris Foundation, which occasionally donates to people living on the streets in Ghana.

Filmography 
 Akwabaa

Online skits 
 Don't Leave Me Challenge
 Fear Women
 Accra Mall Love
 Journey to Benin
 Adventures of Waris
 Obinim Shoe Challenge
 Don't Steal From Efo
 Breast of No Nation
 False Prophet (comedy)
 Mobile Phone Yawa
 Something Must Kill A Man
 Condition Of Nose Mask
 The Best Comedian In Ghana - Comedian Waris

Movie Series 

 Agenda Boys
Fufu funu

Videography 
 Sista afia  - Party
 Fameye - Noting I Get
 Fameye - Destiny
 Ogidi brown - Favor Us

Discography 

 Agenda Boys ft. Wutah Kobby & Exodus Links

Awards

External links

References

Ghanaian comedians
Living people
Ghanaian male film actors
Year of birth missing (living people)